The 2013 WAFL Grand Final was an Australian rules football game contested between the West Perth Football Club and the East Perth Football Club on Sunday 22 September 2013 at Patersons Stadium, to determine the premier team of the West Australian Football League (WAFL) for the 2013 season.

West Perth won the game by 49 points - 20.11 (131) to 12.10 (82) - and Mark Hutchings of West Perth was awarded the Simpson Medal. The win gave West Perth's 19th WAFL premiership.

Match Details

Teams

References

West Australian Football League Grand Finals
WAFL